Philippine presidents issue executive orders to help officers and agencies of the executive branch manage the operations within the government itself. Listed below are executive orders signed by Philippine President Rodrigo Duterte.

Executive orders

2016

2017

2018

2019

2020

2021

2022

See also
 List of major acts and legislation during the presidency of Rodrigo Duterte

References

External links
 
 

Duterte, Rodrigo
Presidency of Rodrigo Duterte